The 2021 Orlando City SC season was the club's 11th season of existence in Orlando and seventh season as a Major League Soccer franchise, the top-flight league in the United States soccer league system. There was no U.S. Open Cup for the second consecutive year as a result of the COVID-19 pandemic but the team did take part in the Leagues Cup for the first time.

Season review

Pre-season 
Unlike previous seasons, Orlando had relatively little player turnover and instead focused on retaining the core of the squad following the club's first playoff appearance in 2020. Four permanent transfers were made in December 2020, all purchase options of players previously on loan with Orlando: Antônio Carlos, Rodrigo Schlegel, Andrés Perea and Alexander Alvarado. Six players did not have their options exercised and were released. Most notable of these was Designated Player Dom Dwyer who had been limited to two appearances in 2020 due to a knee injury. He had returned to Orlando in July 2017 for a then MLS-record $1.6 million in allocation money. The club also acquired two loan players to provide depth in key positions: goalkeeper Brandon Austin on loan from Tottenham Hotspur and left-back Jonathan Suárez from Querétaro although the latter was arrested and had his loan terminated prior to the start of preseason. Having released Dwyer and allowed Daryl Dike to join Barnsley initially on a short-term loan in January, Orlando reinforced their forward options by announcing the free agent signing of former Golden Boy winner and Brazil international Alexandre Pato on February 13, before also securing the signing of Dutch winger Silvester van der Water from Heracles Almelo, having unsuccessfully pursued him the previous September.

With the addition of Austin FC in 2021, MLS held an Expansion Draft on December 15, 2020. Orlando had 13 players exposed. Kamal Miller was selected by Austin who immediately traded him to the Montreal Impact in exchange for $225,000 in General Allocation Money and a first round pick (11th) in the 2021 MLS SuperDraft. It was the second time an Orlando player had been taken in an expansion draft after Mikey Ambrose was selected in 2016.

On January 21, Orlando made four selections in the 2021 MLS SuperDraft including three in the first round. Derek Dodson and Rio Hope-Gund were both signed but neither appeared during the season. Brandon Hackenberg returned to college to exhaust his eligibility before later signing with the relaunched Orlando City B in MLS Next Pro ahead of the 2022 season.

On February 5, MLS and the MLS Players Association agreed to a new Collective Bargaining Agreement (CBA) through 2027 after extending the deadline by a day to avoid a lockout. The primary issues negotiated were increased player spending, expanded free agency, and more charter travel. The league had invoked a force majeure clause in late December 2020 to reopen negotiations over the current CBA, citing ongoing uncertainty because of the COVID-19 pandemic. Following the CBA's ratification, MLS announced it had pushed back the start of the regular season to April 17 due to the extended labor negotiations.

On March 23, Orlando were selected as one of four MLS teams to compete in the 2021 Leagues Cup as one of the top two teams from each conference not scheduled to take part in the Champions League. It will be the club's first time in the competition.

On April 5, U.S. Soccer and MLS announced it would be trialing the new IFAB approved concussion substitutes rule allowing for two additional substitutions  in each match to be used for players with suspected concussions. The new rule was implemented on top of the increase from three to five "normal" substitutes carried over from the 2020 season.

April 
Orlando opened the season on April 17 at home to Atlanta United FC, notably missing starters Mauricio Pereyra through suspension, Robin Jansson and João Moutinho due to injury, and Daryl Dike still on loan. Marque offseason signing Alexandre Pato made his debut starting in the opener but was forced off injured in the 80th minute with Silvester van der Water debuting as a substitute in his place. A goalless draw preserved Orlando's unbeaten record on matchday one since joining MLS in 2015. Orlando's opening road game of the season was against Sporting Kansas City, one of only two scheduled Western Conference opponents of the regular season, on April 23. Having conceded first when Dániel Sallói caught Pedro Gallese playing out from the back before setting up Gianluca Busio to score on the stroke of halftime, the Lions battled back in the second half to tie courtesy of a Nani backheel goal. The game also saw both teams have goals correctly ruled out for offside following VAR reviews.

May 
Orlando's first win of the season came in gameweek three as FC Cincinnati visited Exploria Stadium. Tesho Akindele opened the scoring of a dominant 3–0 victory in a franchise record 31 seconds. In total, the Lions recorded 23 shots. The second goal of the game, scored by Nani chopping back on his left, sitting a defender down in the process and curling the ball into the top corner from 22 yards was voted MLS goal of the week. On May 8, Nani scored for the third consecutive game as Orlando City took the lead at home to New York City FC before João Moutinho, who had been called on as a halftime substitute to make his first appearance of the season following an injury to Ruan, conceded the game-tying penalty of a 1–1 draw. The club set a new record on May 16 with a 1–0 victory away to D.C. United as the five game unbeaten streak was the Lions' longest such run to start a season. Mauricio Pereyra scored the only goal of the game in the 7th minute. From then on Orlando defended deep, conceding shots but D.C. only registered one on target. Their frustrations eventually boiled over as home fans threw debris on to the field and players clashed in stoppage time. Hernán Losada was particularly embittered by Orlando's tactics stating: "The way where you dominate the whole game, the opponent doesn't know what else to do to neutralize the game, to waste time, to park the bus. They didn't want to play after they scored the goal." The result left Orlando as one of three remaining unbeaten teams in the league. Nani retrospectively received a two-game suspension following a review by the MLS Disciplinary Committee that deemed he had made "unwanted physical contact" with the referee while trying to prevent further clashing between the two sets of players in stoppage time. The MLS Players Association issued a rebuke condemning the decision for "lacking integrity." On May 17, it was announced Exploria Stadium would be open to full capacity in June 2021, the first time since the 2020 season opener on February 29. February signing Silvester van der Water made his first start in place of the suspended Nani on 22 May 2021. He provided his first MLS assist for Akindele on the only goal of the game and was named player of the match as Orlando beat Toronto FC 1–0 to extend their unbeaten start to the season to six. The unbeaten start to the season ended on May 29 with a 2–1 defeat on the road to New York Red Bulls. Despite the good form, Orlando struggled to hold possession and came under persistent pressure, conceding twice within an hour. The Lions looked a better goal threat following the introduction of van der Water who came off the bench to score his first goal in the 84th minute but missed a clear opportunity to equalize shortly after. The game was also notable for the senior debut of Michael Halliday who started the game, setting a new record as the youngest first-team player at 18 years, 127 days, beating Tommy Redding's record set in August 2015 by 70 days.

June 
Major League Soccer scheduled a three week break at the start of June during the FIFA international window which included the 2021 CONCACAF Nations League Finals. Having returned from his loan spell at Barnsley, Daryl Dike was the only Orlando player involved in the competition. He attended the pre-tournament training camp for the United States and, although he did not make the final roster, continued to travel and train with the squad as the United States won the inaugural edition of the tournament. He scored his first international goal later in the international window on June 9, 2021, in a 4–0 friendly win over Costa Rica at Rio Tinto Stadium. Sebas Méndez and Pedro Gallese were both called-up to Ecuador and Peru respectively for the 2021 Copa América contested in Brazil from June 13 to July 10, meaning they could both be absent for as many as five Orlando games. On June 15, Thomas Williams became the club's 11th homegrown signing and the youngest ever first-team signing at 16 years, 304 days, surpassing the record set by Tommy Redding in 2014. In the absence of Gallese, loanee Brandon Austin made his debut against Toronto FC on June 19, becoming the youngest goalkeeper to make an appearance for the club. Despite a fast start, with Akindele scoring in the opening minute for the second time in six games and Nani doubling the lead seven minutes later, the teams went in at the break level as Toronto, who were using Exploria Stadium as a temporary base as travel to and from Canada remained restricted, battled back through Ayo Akinola and Jonathan Osorio goals. Daryl Dike made his return as a second half substitute before Júnior Urso sealed a late and emotional win for Orlando which the players and Óscar Pareja dedicated to teammate Rodrigo Schlegel who had returned to Argentina the previous month after his father had contracted COVID-19 and passed away the week prior. The game was played behind closed doors as a designated Toronto home game in attempt to protect homefield advantage. A midweek matchup three days later, delayed twice by lightning, saw Orlando equal their record margin of victory, a 5–0 victory against San Jose Earthquakes. Dike scored a brace on his first start of the season as did Benji Michel, the first multiple goal game of his professional career. Orlando's only other five goal winning margin to date had come in a 6–1 win over New England in September 2017. Orlando ended the month with their third game in seven days, a rivalry match against Inter Miami CF. Orlando came back from a Gonzalo Higuaín goal to win 2–1 as Chris Mueller volleyed in his first goal of the season to tie the game up before Nani struck the winner from distance in the 80th minute.

July 
On July 1, Dike was named to the final 23-man United States roster for the 2021 CONCACAF Gold Cup, Orlando's sole representative in the original squads although Tesho Akindele was called-up by Canada at the quarter-final stage on July 23 as an injury replacement for Ayo Akinola. Exploria Stadium was used as a host venue for six of the tournament's group games. Orlando City started July with back to back defeats, first losing to New York Red Bulls for a second time on the year as Fábio struck a late winner to hand Orlando their first home defeat of the season. Oscar Pareja fielded a heavily rotated side on the road four days later as Chicago Fire FC came from behind to win 3–1. Andrés Perea scored Orlando's only goal of the game, his first for the club, as Sebas Méndez made his return from the Copa América as a substitute. It marked the first time in Pareja's 19-month tenure that Orlando City lost consecutive regular season games having last done so under James O'Connor in August 2019. The winless streak extended to three with a 1–1 draw as Orlando ventured north to play Toronto FC for the third time in 13 games. The game was Toronto's first on Canadian soil since March 7, 2020, following the easing of travel restrictions. Jozy Altidore opened the scoring as a second-half substitute on his return to the side having been exiled from the team by recently-sacked head coach Chris Armas in late-May. The lead lasted five minutes before Nani scored the equalizer from the spot as Orlando were awarded a penalty on a VAR review after goalkeeper Alex Bono had taken out Benji Michel. On July 21, the sale of Orlando City SC and related soccer assets by Flavio Augusto da Silva, who took over in 2013, was completed. Zygi, Leonard and Mark Wilf became the new majority owners with the DeVos family, led by Dan DeVos, entering as minority owners. The combined value of the deal was estimated at $400–450 million. On the same day it was announced Chris Mueller had signed a pre-contract agreement with an unnamed European club (later revealed to be Hibernian of the Scottish Premiership) and would be leaving upon the expiry of his contract at the end of the 2021 season. Having dropped to fourth in the East as a result of Nashville's draw the previous day, Orlando City hosted reigning Supporters' Shield winners Philadelphia Union who sat one point and two places above them in the standings before kickoff on July 22. Having opened a two goal lead courtesy of Michel and Perea, Kacper Przybyłko struck back in the 68th minute to set up a frantic finish. With four added minutes originally signaled, a concussion check on Orlando's Robin Jansson extended the time further as Orlando closed out the win with Kyle Smith making a 98th-minute goal line clearance, throwing himself in front of a point-blank Quinn Sullivan strike to block it with his face. The result meant Orlando leapfrogged Philadelphia into 2nd. Three days later the team was handed the biggest defeat under Pareja to date and the joint-worst margin of defeat in club history as Pareja made five changes to field yet another rotated team on a short week road game, this time away at Yankee stadium to face New York City FC. The likes of Nani and Mueller were left out of the squad completely, while Pereyra was suspended on yellow card accumulation, and Dike and Akindele remained away at the Gold Cup. Newest signing Emmanuel Mas made his debut from the start as the Lions lost 5–0 with five different players finding the scoresheet. On July 28, it was announced Alex Leitão, Orlando's Chief Executive Officer since 2015, was stepping down from his role. Orlando closed out the July schedule with another rivalry match against Atlanta United FC. 23-year-old academy product Mason Stajduhar made his club debut starting as goalkeeper, 2,090 days after first signing as a Homegrown in November 2015. Josef Martínez opened the scoring in 47 seconds before Kyle Smith, who was the only Orlando City player to start all 16 matches of the season so far, scored his first goal as a Lion since joining in 2019 to level before the break. Marcelino Moreno restored Atlanta's lead with a curling long-range golazo in the 66th minute before the 74th-minute introduction of Silvester van der Water turned things around. He scored the equalizer before turning provider, crossing for Nani's 87th-minute winner. The result extended Atlanta's franchise-record 11-game winless streak while Orlando remained unbeaten in six against their rivals and regained second place in the Eastern Conference. Nani, who also had one goal and one assist in the game, was later voted MLS Player of the Week. On July 31, former Orlando goalkeeper Adam Grinwis rejoined the club having last played for the Lions in 2019. The signing coincided with the end of Brandon Austin's loan on the same day.

August 
With a condensed schedule and mounting list of unavailable players including Pedro Gallese, Antônio Carlos, João Moutinho, Sebas Méndez, Alexandre Pato and Daryl Dike, Orlando's slump continued in August with back to back 1–1 ties with two teams below the playoff line: first at home to bottom-of-the-table Inter Miami CF on August 4 and again three days later on the road to FC Cincinnati. Antônio Carlos scored his first goal of the season in the former but was knocked unconscious in the process and had to leave the game. The latter match marked the first time Orlando had played at the newly-built TQL Stadium and saw Nani come off the bench to score the equalizer within one minute of entering. On August 12, Orlando played a non-domestic match for the first time, a 2021 Leagues Cup quarter-final against Mexican side Santos Laguna. Despite having 53% possession and matching Santos' 13 shots, Orlando narrowly lost 1–0, hampered by wasteful finishing. Frustrations boiled over at full-time as Júnior Urso received a red card after the final whistle for remonstrating with the referee. With New York City FC and Nashville SC pushing Orlando down into fourth place having not played a fixture over the weekend, Orlando played out a third successive league draw the following midweek. The Lions trailed to a C. J. Sapong goal in the first half on the road to third-place Nashville, before another set-piece header from Antônio Carlos rescued a point. Philadelphia's victory over NYCFC the same night meant Orlando moved another place down into fifth, the lowest position since the second week of the season. Orlando jumped back up to second place just three days later as two Homegrowns lifted the Lions to a 1–0 victory over Chicago Fire FC: Benji Michel scored his fourth goal of the season while goalkeeper Mason Stajduhar kept his first career clean sheet after making five saves on the night. Orlando ended August undefeated in league play (one win, four draws), finishing the month with a goalless draw with Inter Miami. The Lions looked likeliest to break the deadlock but Tesho Akindele had his penalty saved by Nick Marsman before Robin Jansson had a goal disallowed after review having been touched by an offside Akindele. The game also saw the return of Daryl Dike who entered as a halftime substitute for Akindele, his first appearance since leaving for international duty on July 3.

September 
Orlando opened September with a 3–2 win at home to Columbus Crew. Having taken a two-goal lead into halftime, the Crew scored two goals in two minutes early in the second half to level. Júnior Urso scored the gamewinner in the 69th minute. A comprehensive 3–0 defeat on the road at Atlanta United on September 10 was followed up five days later with a midweek defeat at home to CF Montréal in which Nani picked up two first-half yellow cards to leave the Lions down a player while trying to overturn a two-goal deficit. Having found one goal through Robin Jansson in the 40th minute, 10-man Orlando found an equalizer through an unlikely source - Ruan scored his first goal for the club with just over an hour played. However, Montreal made their numerical advantage pay, eventually running out 4–2 winners as Orlando finished the game with nine players when Andrés Perea was sent off late on. The losing streak continued into its third game as Orlando traveled to Philadelphia four days later. A controversial opener, that was not overturned for an elbow to the face by Kacper Przybyłko on Rodrigo Schlegel despite the linesman signaling for the foul and VAR recommending a review, saw the Lions trail at the half once again. Ruan tied the game after the break with his second goal in as many games but Przybyłko restored the Union's lead four minutes later and the Lions again finished the game down a man, this time Antônio Carlos received the red card for bringing Sergio Santos down for a late penalty which Przybyłko slotted past Gallese. Having started the month still second in the East, the three game losing streak saw the Lions plummet down to fourth and fighting to remain above the playoff line. The skid continued as Orlando headed to Supporters' Shield leaders New England Revolution on September 25. Adam Buksa gave the home side the lead in the ninth minute before Dike leveled the scores in the 18th minute. New England's one-goal lead was restored through a Rodrigo Schlegel own goal in the 35th minute which would prove to be the deciding goal as the Revolution survived a 75th-minute penalty; Matt Turner saved Nani's spot kick, the third time an Orlando player had failed to convert a penalty in five attempts in 2021. The 2–1 result saw Orlando's losing streak extend to four games in all competitions, equaling the franchise record, as the team dropped another place to 5th. The losing streak was snapped at four when Orlando visited Nashville SC midweek on September 29, the team's third consecutive road game and their second on an in-season NFL field. The Lions fell behind early when Sebas Méndez conceded a penalty which, although saved by Gallese, was converted on the rebound by Hany Mukhtar. Randall Leal doubled the home side's lead in the second half. Following Orlando's recent penalty woes, Daryl Dike stepped up and scored a 72nd-minute spot kick having also won the foul to reduce the deficit and an Brian Anunga own goal in the third minute of second-half stoppage time salvaged a point as the game finished 2–2. However, failure to win meant Orlando fell to 7th in the Eastern Conference, now only two points above the playoff line, as victories for D.C. United and Atlanta United earlier in the evening saw them jump ahead of Orlando.

October 
Having ended the four-losing streak with a stoppage time equalizer in the previous game, Orlando ended a five-game winless run with another goal in stoppage time on October 2 as Daryl Dike headed home from a corner in the 90+7th minute to lift the Lions to a 2–1 victory at home to D.C. United. The visitors had taken the lead through Julian Gressel in the sixth minute when his long-range effort caught out Pedro Gallese but had leveled when Robin Jansson reacted quickest to a rebound from a corner. The three points moved Orlando back up to 4th in a tight Eastern Conference playoff race as three points separated the six teams from 3rd to 8th-place with six games left. Orlando headed to FC Cincinnati off the back of an international break on October 16 and took an early lead against the league's lowest-ranked team through a long range curling Junior Urso shot that skipped into the bottom corner. An 84th-minute Tesho Akindele strike from 30 yards cannoned off the underside of the crossbar and appeared to cross the goalline. However, the officials did not award a goal and no camera angle could provide substantial enough evidence to overturn the call. Orlando escaped with all three points despite a stoppage time penalty scare when VAR was consulted to weigh in on a Rodrigo Schlegel collision with Brandon Vazquez in the box. An explanation was later issued by the referee stating that a penalty was not given because Schlegel had been pushed into Vazquez by FC Cincinnati's Nick Hagglund. The victory marked the first time since gameweek 10 on June 25 that Orlando won consecutive games. Four days later, the Lions hosted playoff rivals CF Montréal who sat four points behind Orlando in 7th. Having largely controlled the first half, Orlando finally broke the deadlock on the stroke of halftime when Chris Mueller ghosted in at the back post to score his third goal of the season and his first since announcing his end of season departure in July. However, the visitors rallied and began the second half quickly as Sunusi Ibrahim forced a point blank save from Gallese before Rudy Camacho headed the equalizer from a corner in the 50th minute. Searching for a winner, Orlando turned to Pato as an 86th-minute substitute, marking his first appearance since he left the season opener injured 187 days earlier. The game ended 1–1 as both Orlando and Montreal extended their unbeaten runs to four and three games respectively. Having clinched the 2021 Supporters' Shield the previous day by virtue of Sporting Kansas City beating second-place Seattle Sounders FC, New England Revolution traveled to Orlando on October 24 and rested nine starters. A full-strength Orlando controlled the first half capped off by top goalscorer Nani who rose to head home in the closing stages of the first half, breaking his 10-game scoreless streak. A Dike penalty, won by Nani, doubled the Lions' lead after the break. However, having notably substituted on all three of their designated players Gustavo Bou, Adam Buksa and Carles Gil, New England staged a late comeback: Buska scored in the 81st and 90+3rd minutes to split the points and prevent Orlando from moving up to 3rd place ahead of Nashville. Buksa was later named MLS Player of the Week for his performance against Orlando. Three days later, Orlando faced Columbus Crew on the road, falling to a two-goal deficit in the first half, both conceded from corners. Dike's third successful penalty of the season, which was originally saved but retaken because Eloy Room had come off his goal line early, halved the deficit but Lucas Zelarayán, having assisted the other two goals, scored one of his own from 30 yards to restore the two-goal cushion. Orlando City defender Robin Jansson, who became the Lions' all-time leader in minutes played for outfield players during the game, smartly sided-footed an Akindele cross past Room in the 90+2nd minute to set up a close finish but it wasn't enough to rescue a point as Orlando fell back down to 5th in the conference standings with two games remaining. Orlando went into the following game knowing that, because of victories for New York Red Bulls and Columbus Crew the day before, a win against Nashville SC would clinch a playoff place with a game to spare. The Lions took the lead through Dike, his third goal in as many games, before Mukhtar pulled Nashville level in the second half. A game of few clear cut chances, Orlando thought they had scored a 90+4th minute playoff-clinching game winner as substitute Perea followed in the rebound of a Pato freekick to poke the ball across the line. However, referee Allen Chapman, who had been at the center of controversy and was suspended by the league for his performance during Orlando's penalty shootout victory in the first round of the previous season's playoffs, consulted VAR and decided to rule out the goal for a supposed foul committed by Dike in the buildup much to the bewilderment of everyone in the stadium. On the decision, Óscar Pareja said during his postgame press conference: "It's a very sad day for the league. There's no explanation on a play that was so evident." Charlie Davies and Andrew Wiebe reviewed the event as part of MLS' own in-house media, both agreeing there was no foul and the decision was incorrect, even considering that Alistair Johnston was more likely fouling Dike than vice versa. PRO also later reviewed the decision, admitting the contact was minimal, did not meet the threshold for VAR intervention and therefore the on-field decision of a goal should have stood. The draw kept Orlando in 5th although only one point ahead of Atlanta and two points ahead of New York Red Bulls who faced each other in their game in hand during the following midweek. Orlando's decision day opponents Montreal, sitting five points behind the Lions in 10th, also had a game in hand and hosted Houston on Wednesday.

November

Decision Day
As a result of Atlanta United's midweek draw with New York Red Bulls, Orlando City fell one spot to 6th ahead of decision day. It was still possible for the Lions to finish as high as 4th or as low as 8th. Opponents Montreal had beat Houston midweek so moved two points behind Orlando meaning the Canadian side was now in a position to move above Orlando with a win on the final day. A draw would clinch a playoff berth for Orlando irrespective of results elsewhere while defeat would make the team reliant on New York Red Bulls losing away to Nashville. Orlando ultimately took care of their own business, clinching playoff qualification with a 2–0 victory in Montreal. After a cagey first half, Sebas Méndez opened the scoring in the 55th minute when he blasted the ball into the top corner from 20 yards. It was his first goal for the club on his 65th appearance. As Montreal's desperation increased, Rudy Camacho was shown a straight red card for an out of control challenge on Dike in the 79th minute before Dike doubled Orlando's lead late on to secure the win that saw Orlando finish the regular season 6th in the Eastern Conference.

Playoffs
Orlando entered the 2021 MLS Cup Playoffs as the Eastern Conference's #6 seed, setting up an away trip to #3 seed Nashville SC in the first round. The teams had met three times during the regular season with all three ending in draws. Dike gave Orlando an early first-half lead when he headed in from a Pereyra corner but Hany Mukhtar leveled seven minutes later with a 25-yard strike that took a deflection to sail over Pedro Gallese's head. Mukhtar doubled his and Nashville's tally in the second half, slotting home after a surging solo dribble before Jhonder Cádiz added a third deep into stoppage time to end the Lions' season.

Roster 

 Last updated on November 5, 2021

Staff

Competitions

Friendlies
MLS required all players to report for preseason by March 1 in order to undergo a mandatory seven-day quarantine period and medical testing in light of the ongoing COVID-19 pandemic. Players who volunteered to quarantine earlier were permitted to begin group workouts from March 1 prior to the official start of team training on March 8.

Major League Soccer 

Outside of the club, Austin FC joined the league as an expansion franchise, bringing the total number of MLS clubs to 27. However, Austin FC and Orlando City did not meet in the 2021 season. Sporting Kansas City and San Jose Earthquakes were the only Western Conference teams Orlando faced in the regular season in a bid to keep to a limited, regionalized schedule during the ongoing COVID-19 pandemic. The top seven teams from each conference qualified for the playoffs.

Results summary

Results

Standings
Eastern Conference table

Overall table

MLS Cup Playoffs

U.S. Open Cup 

On March 29, the USSF and Open Cup Committee confirmed plans for a shortened 16-team U.S. Open Cup including the cancellation of the opening stages. The competition was originally scheduled to begin at the Round of 16 stage with MLS holding eight berths given to the top eight US-based MLS clubs in the 2021 regular season standings based on average points per game as of the third weekend of play on May 3. However, on April 16, the committee decided to not hold the competition in spring due to "logistical and financial challenges" but left open the possibility of holding it later in the year. The competition was officially canceled on July 20.

Leagues Cup 

Orlando City were one of four MLS teams qualified for the 2021 edition of the Leagues Cup as one of the top two teams from each conference based on the 2020 regular season standings not scheduled to participate in the Champions League. The single-elimination tournament took place entirely in the United States and saw each MLS team drawn against a Liga MX team for the opening round.

Squad statistics

Appearances 

Starting appearances are listed first, followed by substitute appearances after the + symbol where applicable.

|-
! colspan=12 style=background:#dcdcdc; text-align:center|Goalkeepers

|-
! colspan=12 style=background:#dcdcdc; text-align:center|Defenders

|-
! colspan=12 style=background:#dcdcdc; text-align:center|Midfielders

|-
! colspan=12 style=background:#dcdcdc; text-align:center|Forwards

|-
|colspan="12"|Players away from the club on loan:

|-
|colspan="12"|Players who appeared for the club but left during the season:

|}

Goalscorers

Shutouts

Disciplinary record

Player movement 
Per Major League Soccer and club policies, terms of the deals do not get disclosed.

MLS SuperDraft picks 
Draft picks are not automatically signed to the team roster. The 2021 MLS SuperDraft was held on January 21, 2021. Orlando had four selections.

Transfers in

Loans in

Transfers out

Loans out

References 

Orlando City SC seasons
Orlando City
Orlando City
Orlando City